Tri-State Airport  (Milton J. Ferguson Field) is a public airport in Wayne County, West Virginia, United States, three miles south of Huntington, West Virginia, near Ceredo and Kenova. Owned by the Tri-State Airport Authority, it serves Huntington; Ashland, Kentucky; and Ironton, Ohio. It has heavy use for general aviation, and after the withdrawal of Delta Air Lines in June 2012, is down to two airlines, one of which provides nationwide connecting service.  On August 2, 2021, a federal subsidy was announced to subsidize flights to Washington-Dulles and Chicago-O'Hare airports.  It is not yet known which airline will operate the flights.  

Federal Aviation Administration records say the airport had 115,263 passenger boardings (enplanements) in calendar year 2010, 10.9% more than 2009. The Federal Aviation Administration (FAA) National Plan of Integrated Airport Systems for 2017–2021 categorized it as a non-hub primary commercial service facility.

The first airline flights were Piedmont DC-3s around the end of 1952; Eastern and Allegheny arrived in 1953. Eastern left about the end of 1972; Piedmont and Allegheny remained through the 1989 merger. The first jets were Piedmont 737s in 1969 (the runway was then 5280 feet).

Eastern Airlines provided jet service beginning July 1, 1968 using a DC-9 jet. According to the Eastern Airlines timetable, effective June 21, 1968, the routing was LEX-HTS-EWR. HTS had 5 other EA in the same schedule with 1 on a Lockheed Electra & the other 4 on Convair 440s. The airport is the second busiest airport in West Virginia after Yeager Airport in Charleston, West Virginia. Huntington Tri-State airport has the second longest runway in West Virginia. The airport is replacing lights in the terminal and hangars with LED lights as of November 2021.

Facilities
The airport covers 1,300 acres (526 ha) at an elevation of 828 feet (252 m). It has one runway, 12/30, 7,017 by 150 feet (2,139 x 46 m) asphalt.

In the year ending February 28, 2017 the airport had 12,870 aircraft operations, average 35 per day: 46% general aviation, 32% air taxi, 15% airline, and 7% military. In December 2017, 48 aircraft were based at the airport: 35 single-engine, 8 multi-engine, 3 jet, 1 helicopter, and 1 ultralight. The airport has the only FedEx B-757 hub in West Virginia.

Economic Impact 
A study by Marshall University's Center for Business and Economic Research (CBER) in 2006 published a finding that the economic output was $50.4 million, with an income of $21.1 million and 803 jobs and $3.5 million state and local tax revenue. 

A series of Airport Improvement Projects (AIPS) were completed from 2006 to 2014 with a total cost of $39,226,015.00 based on $36,716,290.00 federal funds, $1,141,993.53 state funds, and $322,966.90 local funds.

Airlines and destinations

Passenger

Cargo

Top destinations

FedEx Feeder is operated at the field by Mountain Air Cargo.

Incidents
 On November 14, 1970, in what has been recognized as "the worst sports related air tragedy in U.S. history," Southern Airways Flight 932, a chartered Southern Airways DC-9, crashed into a hill just short of runway 12 (then runway 11, due to differences in magnetic declination between 1970 and today). The flight carried 37 members of the Marshall University "Thundering Herd" football team, eight members of the coaching staff, and 25 boosters. There were no survivors. The tragedy was the basis of the 2006 film We Are Marshall.
 On January 30, 2009 a Piper PA-34-200T Seneca crashed near KHTS in a snowstorm. The pilot was trying to divert to KHTS due to a fuel emergency; all six aboard were killed.

References

External links
 Tri-State Airport, official website
 Huntington/Tri-State Airport from 2008 West Virginia DOT Airport Directory
 
 
 
 http://www.wvculture.org/history/transportation/tristateairport01.html
 https://www.airnav.com/airport/KHTS
 https://aeronav.faa.gov/d-tpp/2205/00532AD.PDF
 https://skyvector.com/airport/HTS/Tri-State-Milton-J-Ferguson-Field-Airport

Airports in West Virginia
Buildings and structures in Wayne County, West Virginia
Transportation in Wayne County, West Virginia